

Qualification system
A total of 70 triathletes (35 men and 35 women) will qualify to compete at the games. A nation may enter a maximum of six athletes (three per gender). Triathletes will qualify through various qualification events and rankings in 2014 and 2015. The host nation Canada, automatically qualifies a full team of six athletes. There will also be three wild card spots per gender awarded. An athlete can only qualify one quota spot for their country.

21 slots per gender will be awarded using the ITU Points list. Athletes must be in the top 250 of the said list to receive a quota. If there isn't enough athletes in the top 250 to meet the quota, the spots will be transferred to wild cards.

Qualification timeline

Qualification summary

Qualification progress

Both declined Argentina quotas from the Pan American Sports Festival and South American Championships were won by the same athlete, who won a quota at the 2014 South American Games. These two slots were reallocated to the points list qualifiers. 
Only 22 and 17 female athletes were in the top 250 of the ITU Points List, and thus the last remaining spots for each event became a part of the wildcards.

References

External links
Pan American Sports Festival results
South American Championship results
Central American and Caribbean Championship results

P
P
Qualification for the 2015 Pan American Games
Triathlon at the 2015 Pan American Games